USS Kentucky (SSBN-737) is a United States Navy  ballistic missile submarine which has been in commission since 1991. She is the third U.S. Navy ship to be named for Kentucky, the 15th state.

Construction and commissioning
The contract to build Kentucky was awarded to the Electric Boat Division of General Dynamics Corporation in Groton, Connecticut, on 13 August 1985 and her keel was laid down there on 18 December 1987. She was launched on 11 August 1990, sponsored by Carolyn Pennebaker Hopkins, who used a custom blend of Kentucky bourbon whiskey, mixed for the occasion, rather than the traditional bottle of champagne to christen Kentucky.  She was commissioned on 13 July 1991, with Captain Michael G. Riegel commanding the Blue Crew and Captain Joseph Henry commanding the Gold Crew.

Service history

On 19 March 1998 south of Long Island, New York, Kentucky collided with the attack submarine  while the two submarines were conducting a joint training drill prior to deployment. One of Kentuckys stern planes was slightly damaged; San Juans forward ballast tank was breached, but San Juan was able to surface and return to port. No personnel suffered any injuries. Kentucky returned to patrol the next day.

In both 2001 and 2002, Kentuckys Gold Crew won first place in the United States Atlantic Fleet in the Captain Edward F. Ney Memorial Award Submarine Afloat Galley competition for outstanding food service.

In 2005 both the Blue and Gold Crews of Kentucky were appointed Kentucky Colonels by Kentucky Governor Ernie Fletcher.

Kentucky was awarded the Battle Efficiency Award (Battle "E") for Submarine Squadron 17 for 2006 and 2009.

Kentuckys Gold Crew was awarded a Captain Edward F. Ney Memorial Award Honorable Mention for food service in 2007.

Kentuckys Blue and Gold Crews were awarded the Omaha Trophy for service as the best ballistic missile submarine in 2009.

On 12 October 2011, Kentucky had only her periscope above water, when she turned onto a new course that was blocked by the Totem Ocean ship Midnight Sun. The submarine came into close contact of about 800 meters with the freighter near British Columbia in the Strait of Juan de Fuca.

The ship has been featured in both the History Channel's Modern Marvels "Mega Meals" episode in 2010 and in the Smithsonian Channel's Mighty Ships in 2011.

In January 2012 USS Kentucky entered her Engineering Refueling Overhaul (ERO) at Puget Sound Naval Shipyard.

On 7 November 2015, an unarmed missile launched from Kentucky during a test caused buzz on social media as it was mistaken for a UFO or meteor. The launch was also widely reported by the Southern California broadcast media.

On 13 March 2016, following completion of her ERO, Kentucky deployed for the boat's first strategic deterrent mission since 2011.

References

"Welcome Aboard" pamphlet provided to USS Kentucky tour visitors.

External links

 

Ships built in Groton, Connecticut
Ohio-class submarines
Cold War submarines of the United States
Nuclear submarines of the United States Navy
United States submarine accidents
Maritime incidents in 1998
1990 ships
Submarines of the United States